The 1991 general election in Zambia saw the Movement for Multiparty Democracy defeat the ruling United National Independence Party in both presidential and National Assembly polls.

Presidential results by constituency

National Assembly results by constituency

Sources
Electoral Commission of Zambia 

Elections in Zambia
Zambia
1991 in Zambia